Marie-Thérèse Julien Lung-Fou (11 May 1909-1981) was the first female sculptor in Martinique, a storyteller and poet.

Biography 
Born in Fort-de-France, she received her artistic education at the Ecole des Beaux-Arts in Paris. In 1938,  she received a bronze medal at the Paris International Exposition of the Salon of the Society of French Artists.  She married her husband Julien at that time, taking the name Lung-Fou to honor her two grandfathers, one born in Dieppe, the other in Canton, and her mixed-race Martinician grandmothers.

She was the island's first author of Chinese origin, making a name for herself in Creole theatre, with stories and poems also in Creole. This book translates La Fontaine's French tales into Creole, with illustrations by the author. 

She is also known as a collector and writer of créole tales who worked to preserve and maintain creole culture, in Carnival, in her own conduct and through storytelling. 

In its page about the dedication, the town's site quotes Julien Lung-Fou speaking about her interest in tales:

Her writing is used to teach Martinician Creole; it is a part of the literary history of the language as well as an inspiration to contemporary writers.

Bibliography

Books 
1956 

1950s  

1958 

1973 

1979 

1980  (in collaboration with Renée Beuze)

1977 A preface for René Bonneville's (1871-1902) 

1980 

1980 

1980

Theatre 

Poetry 
1958  : (poèmes)

1976

References 

1909 births
1981 deaths
Martiniquais artists
Martiniquais poets
Martiniquais writers
20th-century French sculptors
20th-century French women artists
20th-century French women writers
People from Fort-de-France
Creole culture
Martiniquais people of Asian descent
Martiniquais dramatists and playwrights
French children's writers